The Revolutionary Bolivarian Movement-200 (Movimiento Bolivariano Revolucionario 200 or MBR-200) was the political and social movement that the later Venezuelan president Hugo Chávez founded in 1982. It eventually planned and executed the February 4, 1992 attempted coup. The movement later evolved into the Movement for the Fifth Republic (MVR), set up in July 1997 to support Hugo Chávez's candidacy in the 1998 Venezuelan presidential election.

Foundation

The movement's first members were Chávez and his fellow military officers Felipe Acosta Carles and Jesús Urdaneta Hernández. On 17 December 1982, as Chávez biographer Richard Gott reports, the three revolutionary officers swore an oath underneath the great tree at Samán de Güere, near Maracay, repeating the words of the pledge that Simón Bolívar had made in Rome in 1805, when he swore to devote his life to the liberation of Venezuela from Spanish yoke: "I swear before you, and I swear before the God of my fathers, that I will not allow my arm to relax, nor my soul to rest, until I have broken the chains that oppress us..."Gott further explains that the suffix "200" was added to the group's name the following year, in 1983, on the 200th anniversary of South American liberator Simon Bolívar's birth.

The movement began "more as a political study circle than as a subversive conspiracy," but soon its members "began thinking in terms of some kind of coup d'état." Chávez and his friends soon recruited more members, including Francisco Arias Cárdenas, in March 1985.

History

February 1992 coup attempt

Chávez' participation in the 1998 election
In the early years after his release, Chávez considered the possibility of another coup attempt, but with the prospects appearing slim, some advisers, notably Luis Miquilena, urged him to reconsider his scepticism of the elections. In July 1997 Chávez registered the new Fifth Republic Movement with the National Electoral Council.

Continuation of the movement
In 2001, Chávez accused the Fifth Republic Movement of bureaucratization under Luis Miquilena and proposed the re-launching of the original MBR-200. This would eventually lead to the consolidation of his movement under the United Socialist Party of Venezuela label in 2007.

References

Sources
 
 Zago, Angela, La Rebelión de los Angeles. Fuentes 1992.

External links
 The Political Process in Venezuela at the End of the 20th Century (in Spanish)

Bolivarian Revolution
Hugo Chávez
Political movements in Venezuela
Organizations established in 1982
1982 establishments in Venezuela
Organizations disestablished in 1997